Michele Ferrero (26 April 1925 – 14 February 2015) was an Italian billionaire businessman.  He owned the chocolate manufacturer Ferrero SpA, Europe's second largest confectionery company (at the time of his death), which he developed from the small bakery and café of his father in Alba, Piedmont.  His first big success was adding vegetable oil to the traditional gianduja paste to make the popular spread Nutella.

Early life
Michele Ferrero was born on 26 April 1925 in Dogliani, the son of Pietro Ferrero, who founded the Ferrero company, and his wife Piera Cillario.

Career
Ferrero joined the firm in 1949.

He was the richest person in Italy, with a personal wealth of $26bn surpassing Silvio Berlusconi in March 2008. In May 2014, the Bloomberg Billionaires Index listed Ferrero as the 20th richest person in the world.

Ferrero's brands include Nutella, Mon Chéri, Kinder Chocolate, Ferrero Rocher, Tic Tacs and Kinder Eggs.

From 1997, his sons, Giovanni Ferrero and Pietro Ferrero, co-led the company.  After Pietro died on 18 April 2011, in an accident in South Africa, Giovanni became the sole CEO.

Personal life
Ferrero married Maria Franca Fissolo in 1962, and they had two sons together, Giovanni Ferrero and Pietro Ferrero Jr.

He was a fervent Catholic. Ferrero visited the Lourdes shrine annually, and had a Madonna placed in every factory and office.
Ferrero died on 14 February 2015, at his home in Monte Carlo, Monaco. He was 89.

See also
List of billionaires

References

1925 births
2015 deaths
Businesspeople in confectionery
Italian billionaires
Italian businesspeople
Italian Roman Catholics
Italian expatriates in Monaco
People from Monte Carlo
Michele
People from Dogliani